Columbia College is a private, for-profit vocational college located in Vienna, Virginia, which offers certificates and associate degrees.

Accreditation and certification 
Since 2007, Columbia College has been nationally accredited by The Council on Occupational Education (COE)  It is certified to operate by the State Council of Higher Education of Virginia (SCHEV).

References

Schools in Fairfax County, Virginia
Schools in Montgomery County, Maryland
Educational institutions established in 1999
1999 establishments in Virginia
Educational institutions accredited by the Council on Occupational Education